Tin Sam Tsuen or Tin Sam Village, sometimes transliterated as Tin Sum Tsuen, is the name of several villages in Hong Kong:

 Tin Sam Tsuen, Islands District, in Islands District
 Tin Sam Tsuen, North District, in Fanling, North District
 Tin Sam Tsuen, Sha Tin District, in Tai Wai, Sha Tin District
 Tin Sam Tsuen, Tai Po District, in Fung Yuen, Tai Po District
 Tin Sam Tsuen, Hung Shui Kiu, in Hung Shui Kiu, Yuen Long District
 Tin Sam Tsuen, Pat Heung, in Pat Heung, Yuen Long District